Crozierpynten is a headland in Ny-Friesland at Spitsbergen, Svalbard. It is located north of Heclahamna at the eastern side of Sorgfjorden. It is named after lieutenant Crozier, member of an Arctic expedition in 1827.

References

Headlands of Spitsbergen